Couchville Cedar Glade State Natural Area is a Class II Natural-Scientific state natural area located in Davidson and Wilson counties Tennessee.  Its western boundary is contiguous with the eastern boundary of Long Hunter State Park.  The park's name reflects its location near the now extinct inundated community of Couchville, Tennessee.

The  reservation is characterized by extensive bare rock intermixed with Eastern red cedars (Juniperus virginiana), grasses, wildflowers (including the Tennessee Coneflower, Echinacea tennesseensis) and associated wildlife along a mile long hiking trail looping through one of the most undisturbed examples of a cedar glade remaining in middle Tennessee.

References

External links
Images of Couchville Cedar Glade State Natural Area from Flickr

Park website
Couchville Cedar Glade Class II Natural-Scientific State Natural Area

State parks of Tennessee
Protected areas of Davidson County, Tennessee
Protected areas of Tennessee